Neurotree is a web-based database for the academic genealogy of neuroscientists. It was established in 2005. Later in 2005, Academic Family Tree began, incorporating Neurotree and academic genealogies of other scholarly disciplines.

Unlike a conventional genealogy or family tree, in which connections among individuals are from kinship (e.g., parents to children), connections in Neurotree and the other Academic Family trees are from mentoring relationships, usually among people working in academic settings (e.g., doctoral supervisor and student).

Neurotree and Academic Family Tree have been used as sources of information for the history and prospects of various academic fields such as psychology, meteorology, organizational communication, and neuroscience. Neurotree has also been used to address infometrics and to research issues of scientific methodology.

Neurotree and the other academic genealogies of Academic Family Tree are volunteer-run; accuracy is maintained by a group of volunteer editors. Hierarchical connections between parents and children are defined as any meaningful mentoring relationship (research assistant, graduate student, postdoctoral fellow, or research scientist) between researchers. Continuous records extend well into the Middle Ages and earlier.
 
As of 5 February 2018, Neurotree contained 116,874 people with 135,773 connections among them. As of 5 February 2018, Academic Family Tree contained 689,800 people with 606,600 connections among them. Academic Family Tree encompasses a broad range of disciplines. As of 5 February 2018, there were 55 disciplines spanning science (e.g., human genetics, microbiology, and psychology), mathematics and philosophy, engineering, and the humanities (e.g., economics, law, and theology).

The two databases are closely linked. A search for a person in Neurotree gives results not only from Neurotree, but also from any of the 54 other trees in Academic Family Tree. A search for a person in from any of the 54 other trees in Academic Family Tree or from the main page of Academic Family Tree gives results from every tree of Academic Family Tree.

Tools
All trees under Academic Family Tree, including Neurotree, have a set of tools similar to those of conventional genealogy applications. One is Distance that allows a user to enter two scholars' names and to determine the number of degrees of separation between the two. For example, the number of degrees of academic separation between Isaac Newton and Marie Curie is 11.

History
Neurotree was founded in January 2005 by Stephen V. David, then an assistant professor in the Oregon Hearing Research Center of Oregon Health and Science University, and by Benjamin Y. Hayden, an assistant professor in the Department of Brain and Cognitive Sciences,
Center for Visual Science, University of Rochester. David and Hayden founded Academic Family Tree soon after founding Neurotree.

In November 2014, David received funding for Neurotree from the Metaknowledge Network. In November 2016, David received funding for Academic Family Tree from the National Science Foundation (NSF) SciSIP Program. In July 2019, David again received funding for Neurotree from the NSF.

Marsh (2017) pointed out that information for Neurotree and Academic Family Tree is provided by volunteers and it is not formally peer-reviewed. She cautioned that this can mean their information is inaccurate.

Relation to other academic genealogies
One other notable discipline-specific academic genealogy is the Mathematics Genealogy Project. Academic Family Tree has its own mathematics tree, MathTree but it is much less complete than the Mathematics Genealogy Project. As of 6 February 2018, MathTree contained 33,634 people whereas the Mathematics Genealogy Project contained 223,794 people.

One other general academic genealogy was PhD Tree. PhD Tree ceased functioning some time after June 2017.

See also
Mathematics Genealogy Project

References

External links
 Neurotree 
 Academic Family Tree

Projects established in 2005
Neuroscience projects
History of neuroscience
Historiography of science
History of science